This Is My Time is The Dogg's fifth studio album release by Mshasho Records. It was set for release on 16 October 2008, but was moved up to 30 November  and later moved to 3 April 2009. The album is the first Dogg album to receive a Team Namibia sticker. The album features appearance by Gal Level, Sunny Boy, Qonja, Elvo, Jericho, Dixon, Ricardo, Nasti, OmPuff and Tre. The entire album is self produced.

The album debuted at number 1 on Namibia's Universal Records, selling close to 7000 copies at its launch. According to The Dogg, more than 2000 copies were already order by fans.

It received mixed reviews from critics and gained an average rating of 6/10. Many criticise the album for its pop-oriented sound and poor track listing. However, the album is praised for its excellent beats.

Track listing 
All tracks produced by The Dogg, except for track 4 produced by Elvo and The Dogg

2009 albums
The Dogg albums
Albums produced by the Dogg
Albums produced by Elvo
Mshasho Productions albums